Matawan is a borough in Monmouth County, in the U.S. state of New Jersey. A historic community located near the Raritan Bay in the much larger Raritan Valley region, the borough is a commuter town of New York City within the New York Metropolitan Area. As of the 2020 United States census, the borough's population was 9,565, reflecting an increase of 755 (8.6%) from the 8,810 counted in the 2010 census, in turn a decline of 100 (−1.1%) from the 8,910 counted in the 2000 Census.

Matawan is part of the Bayshore Regional Strategic Plan, an effort by nine municipalities in northern Monmouth County to reinvigorate the area's economy by emphasizing the traditional downtowns, dense residential neighborhoods, maritime history, and the natural beauty of the Raritan Bayshore coastline.

History

The Lenape Native Americans called the area "," which gave rise to the area being called "Matovancons" by Dutch settlers, from which derives the name "Matawan". The name may derive from a Lenape language word meaning "where two rivers come together" or it may originate from the Southern Unami , "bad riverbank" or "bad hill," a possible reference to bluffs along Raritan Bay which were subject to erosion and collapse prior to the construction of a seawall in the 1970s. Other possible meanings are "magician", "charmed skin" or "it arrives in a lake".

The community was established by Dutch settlers in the 17th century (Matawan celebrated a tricentennial in the 1980s). Scotch-Irish settlers from New Hampshire later named the town New Aberdeen. Neighboring Matawan Township reused the historic name in the 1970s when it changed its name to Aberdeen Township.  It was the formation of Matawan Township in 1857 that shifted this area's name from Middletown Point to Matawan.

Matawan was formed as a borough on June 28, 1895, from portions of Matawan Township (now Aberdeen Township), based on the results of a referendum held that day. Matawan expanded with portions of Matawan Township in 1931 and 1933, and from Madison Township (now Old Bridge Township) in 1939.

Despite being  from the Atlantic Ocean, Matawan was the site of three shark attacks on July 12, 1916, in Matawan Creek, causing two deaths. They closely followed an attack in Beach Haven on July 1 and one in Spring Lake on July 6 that were all part of the Jersey Shore shark attacks of 1916.

Matawan played an important role in aviation navigation history. In 1944, the first operational Visual Aural Range (VAR) was installed at Matawan. Designed in 1937 at the Bureau of Air Commerce's research center, this system operated in the VHF band around 63 mHz and was an incremental improvement over prior aviation navigation systems such as the four-course radio range. VAR was later redeveloped into VOR.

Geography
According to the U.S. Census Bureau, the borough had a total area of 2.41 square miles (6.24 km2), including 2.27 square miles (5.87 km2) of land and 0.14 square miles (0.37 km2) of water (5.89%). The borough is at the northwest corner of Monmouth County and is the second-highest part of Monmouth County.

Unincorporated communities, localities and place names located partially or completely within the borough include Freneau and Oak Shades.

The borough borders Aberdeen Township and Marlboro Township in Monmouth County, as well as Old Bridge Township in Middlesex County. Matawan divides Aberdeen Township into two non-contiguous sections, with a small wedge-shaped exclave on the township's southwest corner separated from the rest of the township by a portion of Matawan located on the opposite side of Route 79.

Demographics

Census 2010

The Census Bureau's 2006–10 American Community Survey showed that (in 2010 inflation-adjusted dollars) median household income was $68,375 (with a margin of error of +/− $7,318) and the median family income was $85,677 (+/− $6,353). Males had a median income of $57,376 (+/− $10,034) versus $42,255 (+/− $14,121) for females. The per capita income for the borough was $39,773 (+/− $5,834). About 3.5% of families and 5.2% of the population were below the poverty line, including 9.6% of those under age 18 and 5.4% of those age 65 or over.

Census 2000
As of the 2000 United States census there were 8,910 people, 3,531 households, and 2,376 families residing in the borough. The population density was 3,909.1 people per square mile (1,508.8/km2). There were 3,640 housing units at an average density of 1,597.0 per square mile (616.4/km2). The racial makeup of the borough was 82.35% White, 6.53% African American, 0.02% Native American, 7.99% Asian, 0.02% Pacific Islander, 1.23% from other races, and 1.85% from two or more races. Hispanic or Latino of any race were 6.45% of the population.

There were 3,531 households, out of which 30.2% had children under the age of 18 living with them, 54.3% were married couples living together, 9.1% had a female householder with no husband present, and 32.7% were non-families. 25.6% of all households were made up of individuals, and 7.8% had someone living alone who was 65 years of age or older. The average household size was 2.52 and the average family size was 3.07.

In the borough the population was spread out, with 22.6% under the age of 18, 7.3% from 18 to 24, 36.4% from 25 to 44, 23.3% from 45 to 64, and 10.5% who were 65 years of age or older. The median age was 36 years. For every 100 females, there were 97.6 males. For every 100 females age 18 and over, there were 95.8 males.

The median income for a household in the borough was $63,594, and the median income for a family was $72,183. Males had a median income of $51,924 versus $37,113 for females. The per capita income for the borough was $30,320. About 3.8% of families and 5.4% of the population were below the poverty line, including 6.9% of those under age 18 and 7.3% of those age 65 or over.

Parks and recreation
Matawan is the northern terminus of the middle segment of the Henry Hudson Trail, and the western terminus of the eastern section.

Government

Local government
Matawan is governed under the Borough form of New Jersey municipal government, which is used in 218 municipalities (of the 564) statewide, making it the most common form of government in New Jersey. The governing body is comprised of the Mayor and the Borough Council, with all positions elected at-large on a partisan basis as part of the November general election. A Mayor is elected directly by the voters to a four-year term of office. The Borough Council is comprised of six members elected to serve three-year terms on a staggered basis, with two seats coming up for election each year in a three-year cycle. The Borough form of government used by Matawan is a "weak mayor / strong council" government in which council members act as the legislative body with the mayor presiding at meetings and voting only in the event of a tie. The mayor can veto ordinances subject to an override by a two-thirds majority vote of the council. The mayor makes committee and liaison assignments for council members, and most appointments are made by the mayor with the advice and consent of the council.

, the Mayor of Matawan is Democrat Joseph Altomonte whose term of office ends December 31, 2023. Members of the Matawan Borough Council are Council President Brian Livesey (D, 2022), Stephanie Buckel (D, 2023), Brett Michael Cannon (D, 2022), Deana Gunn (D, 2023), Charles Ross (R, 2024) and Melanie Wang (R, 2024).

In July 2019, Brian Livesey was appointed to fill the seat expiring in December 2021 that become vacant following the death of David Vergaretti the previous month; Livesey will serve on an interim basis until the November 2019 general election, when voters will select a candidate to serve the balance of the term of office. In the November 2019 general election, Livesey ran and won a full three-year term while John Lazar was elected to serve the balance of Vergaretti's term of office.

Federal, state and county representation
Matawan is located in the 6th Congressional District and is part of New Jersey's 12th state legislative district. Prior to the 2011 reapportionment following the 2010 Census, Matawan had been in the 13th state legislative district.

 

Monmouth County is governed by a Board of County Commissioners comprised of five members who are elected at-large to serve three year terms of office on a staggered basis, with either one or two seats up for election each year as part of the November general election. At an annual reorganization meeting held in the beginning of January, the board selects one of its members to serve as director and another as deputy director. , Monmouth County's Commissioners are
Commissioner Director Thomas A. Arnone (R, Neptune City, term as commissioner and as director ends December 31, 2022), 
Commissioner Deputy Director Susan M. Kiley (R, Hazlet Township, term as commissioner ends December 31, 2024; term as deputy commissioner director ends 2022),
Lillian G. Burry (R, Colts Neck Township, 2023),
Nick DiRocco (R, Wall Township, 2022), and 
Ross F. Licitra (R, Marlboro Township, 2023). 
Constitutional officers elected on a countywide basis are
County clerk Christine Giordano Hanlon (R, 2025; Ocean Township), 
Sheriff Shaun Golden (R, 2022; Howell Township) and 
Surrogate Rosemarie D. Peters (R, 2026; Middletown Township).

Politics
As of March 23, 2011, there were a total of 5,315 registered voters in Matawan, of which 1,355 (25.5%) were registered as Democrats, 1,136 (21.4%) were registered as Republicans and 2,820 (53.1%) were registered as Unaffiliated. There were 4 voters registered as Libertarians or Greens.

In the 2012 presidential election, Democrat Barack Obama received 52.1% of the vote (1,937 cast), ahead of Republican Mitt Romney with 46.6% (1,732 votes), and other candidates with 1.3% (50 votes), among the 3,753 ballots cast by the borough's 5,667 registered voters (34 ballots were spoiled), for a turnout of 66.2%. In the 2008 presidential election, Democrat Barack Obama received 49.9% of the vote (2,090 cast), ahead of Republican John McCain with 47.3% (1,983 votes) and other candidates with 1.4% (57 votes), among the 4,188 ballots cast by the borough's 5,604 registered voters, for a turnout of 74.7%. In the 2004 presidential election, Republican George W. Bush received 52.3% of the vote (2,081 ballots cast), outpolling Democrat John Kerry with 47.3% (1,880 votes) and other candidates with 0.5% (29 votes), among the 3,978 ballots cast by the borough's 5,440 registered voters, for a turnout percentage of 73.1.

In the 2013 gubernatorial election, Republican Chris Christie received 68.2% of the vote (1,638 cast), ahead of Democrat Barbara Buono with 30.3% (727 votes), and other candidates with 1.5% (37 votes), among the 2,432 ballots cast by the borough's 5,678 registered voters (30 ballots were spoiled), for a turnout of 42.8%. In the 2009 gubernatorial election, Republican Chris Christie received 58.0% of the vote (1,639 ballots cast), ahead of Democrat Jon Corzine with 32.5% (920 votes), Independent Chris Daggett with 7.5% (213 votes) and other candidates with 1.2% (35 votes), among the 2,827 ballots cast by the borough's 5,377 registered voters, yielding a 52.6% turnout.

Education
Matawan is part of the Matawan-Aberdeen Regional School District (MARSD), which also serves students from the neighboring community of Aberdeen Township. The district is a comprehensive system comprising seven schools, which includes one preschool, three elementary schools grades K–3, one 4–5 school, one middle school grades 6–8, one high school grades 9–12. As of the 2018–19 school year, the district, comprised of seven schools, had an enrollment of 3,827 students and 324.1 classroom teachers (on an FTE basis), for a student–teacher ratio of 11.8:1. Schools in the district (with 2018–19 enrollment data from the National Center for Education Statistics) are 
Cambridge Park Developmental Learning Center (12 students; Preschool), 
Cliffwood Elementary School (320; K–3), 
Ravine Drive Elementary School (326; K–3 – in Matawan), 
Strathmore Elementary School (397; K–3), 
Lloyd Road Elementary School (614; 4–5), 
Matawan Aberdeen Middle School (888; 6–8) and 
Matawan Regional High School (1,112; 9–12 – in Matawan). The MARSD Central Offices are located at 1 Crest Way, in Aberdeen. Seats on the district's nine-member board of education are allocated based on the population of the constituent municipalities, with three assigned to Matawan.

Transportation

Roads and highways

Matawan is traversed by Route 34, Route 79 and County Route 516. The Garden State Parkway skirts the northern end of the borough (with the southbound lanes only passing through briefly); the nearest exits are exits 118 and 120.

Public transportation
In the late 20th century, Matawan became known for its heavily used train station at Aberdeen-Matawan on NJ Transit's North Jersey Coast Line, which attracts riders from all over western Monmouth County and provides service to New York City's Penn Station, either directly or via Secaucus Junction.

NJ Transit also provides bus service to the Port Authority Bus Terminal in Midtown Manhattan on the 133 and 135 bus lines.

Notable people

People who were born in, residents of, or otherwise closely associated with Matawan include:

 Monica Aksamit (born 1990), saber fencer who won a bronze medal at the 2016 Summer Olympics in the Women's Saber Team event
 Joseph D. Bedle (1821–1894), 23rd Governor of New Jersey, in office from 1875 to 1878
 Ryan Buggle (born 2010), actor and dancer who has appeared on Law & Order: Special Victims Unit.
 Gerard Canonico (born 1989), stage actor
 Connor Clifton (born 1995), ice hockey defenseman for the Boston Bruins of the NHL
 Robert D. Clifton (born 1968), member of the New Jersey General Assembly who was Mayor of Matawan from 1996 to 2005
 Terry Deitz (born 1959), third-place finisher on Survivor: Panama
 Doug Emhoff (born 1964), lawyer, first second gentlemen of the United States, married to Vice President Kamala Harris
 Edward P. Felt (1959–2001), passenger aboard United Airlines Flight 93 who is believed to have made one of the last calls to 9-1-1 immediately prior to the fatal crash of the jetliner
 Philip Freneau (1752–1832), poet during the American Revolutionary War
 Elmer H. Geran (1875–1964), represented New Jersey's 3rd congressional district from 1925 to 1927
 Delores Holmes (born 1946), soul singer
 Erison Hurtault (born 1984), 400m Olympian track runner
 Jim Jeffcoat (born 1961), professional football player for the Dallas Cowboys and the Buffalo Bills from 1983 to 1997
 Howard Kremer (born 1971), comedian and comedic rapper
 Bob McKenty, poet
 Richard Reines, recording industry executive who is co-owner of Drive-Thru Records, a record label specializing largely in pop punk music
 William H. Sutphin (1887–1972), represented  from 1931 to 1943, and was mayor of Matawan from 1915 to 1916 and 1921 to 1926
 Tammy Lynn Sytch (born 1972), professional wrestling manager best known for her time in the World Wrestling Federation as the character, Sunny
 Thom Wasluck, musician and singer-songwriter who known for his music project Planning for Burial
 Jacqueline Walker (born 1941), politician who served in the New Jersey General Assembly from 1984 to 1986
 Greg Wyshynski (born 1977), sportswriter

Community
Matawan was ranked by BusinessWeek magazine at #12 in the nation on their list of "The 50 Best Places to Raise Your Kids" in November 2007.

References

External links

 Borough of Matawan official website
 Matawan-Aberdeen Regional School District
 
 School Data for the Matawan-Aberdeen Regional School District, National Center for Education Statistics
 Matawan First Aid & Rescue Squad

 
1895 establishments in New Jersey
Borough form of New Jersey government
Boroughs in Monmouth County, New Jersey
Populated places established in 1895